Wild Cattle Island is a national park in Queensland, Australia, approximately 25 km southeast of Gladstone.

See also

 Protected areas of Queensland

References 

National parks of Central Queensland
Protected areas established in 1992
1992 establishments in Australia